Eleni Louka (born 25 October 2001) is a Cypriot junior tennis player, who played at the Cyprus on the Fed Cup team since 2017.

Louka has a career-high ITF juniors ranking of 128, achieved on 31 December 2018.

She started studying at Clemson University, in 2019.

ITF junior finals

Singles (4–3)

Doubles (7–5)

National representation

Fed Cup
Louka made her Fed Cup debut for Cyprus in 2017, while the team was competing in the Europe/Africa Zone Group III, when she was 15 years and 234 days old.

Fed Cup (12–10)

Singles (6–7)

Doubles (6–3)

References

External links
 

2001 births
Living people
Cypriot female tennis players
Clemson Tigers women's tennis players